Kristen Merlino is an American art director. She has been nominated for eight Primetime Emmy Awards in the category Outstanding Production Design. Merlino’s nominations included her work for the Grammy Awards ceremonies and one for the Academy Awards ceremony.

References

External links 

Living people
Year of birth missing (living people)
Place of birth missing (living people)
American art directors
Carnegie Mellon University College of Fine Arts alumni
21st-century American women